The Victoria Cup is a rugby union tournament contested by the four African nations of , ,  and  . After a seven-year hiatus, the competition was revived following Rugby Africa's cancellation of the Africa Gold Cup in 2019 due to sponsorship loss.

In 2010 and 2011, the Victoria Cup was played as a trinations tournament between Kenya, Zimbabwe and Uganda on a double round-robin basis, with the teams playing home-and-away. The competition was discontinued in 2012 after Uganda and Zimbabwe withdrew due to financial difficulties.

The Cup is named after Lake Victoria in Kenya and Victoria Falls which were named in honour  the reigning Queen Victoria and her great grandmother.

Champions
The Victoria Cup winners and runners-up from the inaugural trinations tournament of 2010 onward are listed below:

Precursor: 1958–2009
The results of matches involving Kenya, Zimbabwe and Uganda from 1958–2009 are listed below:

Notes

a.  Lake Victoria and the Victoria Falls are not connected contrary to some reports.  The only major river that flows out of Lake Victoria is the River Nile which flows north to the Mediterranean Sea.  The Victoria Falls are on the Zambezi River which begins in Zambia and runs south and east to empty in the Indian Ocean.

b.  Lake Victoria is Africa’s largest lake it is also the largest tropical lake and the second largest freshwater lake in the world.  While the Victoria Falls are neither the highest nor the widest waterfall in the world, it is claimed to be the largest sheet of falling water in the world measuring some 184,500 sq meters.

c.  The 1982 match between the Zimbabwe and East Africa is often listed in popular online databases as being Zimbabwe v Kenya.  In fact it was played by East Africa on the Seventh Tuskers Tour to Zambia and Zimbabwe.  Though this team was almost exclusively (if not entirely) made up of Kenyan players, it is not technically a Kenya v Zimbabwe result. As the Lions is made up of players from England, Ireland, Scotland and Wales, so the East Africa team selects players from Kenya, Uganda and Tanzania.

References

External links 
 Current Official World Rankings
 Historic World Rankings

 
Rugby union competitions in Africa for national teams
International rugby union competitions hosted by Kenya
International rugby union competitions hosted by Zimbabwe
International rugby union competitions hosted by Uganda
Kenya national rugby union team
Uganda national rugby union team
Zimbabwe national rugby union team
2010 establishments in Kenya
2010 establishments in Zimbabwe
2010 establishments in Uganda